Monopoly Junior is a simplified version of the board game Monopoly, designed for young children, which was originally released in 1990. It has a rectangular board that is smaller than the standard game and rather than using street names it is based on a city's amusements (a zoo, a video game arcade, a pizzeria, etc.) to make the game more child-friendly. There are many different models of the game.

History
Parker Brothers began producing Monopoly Junior in 1990, explicitly marketed for players aged five to eight, with a simplified board and game play as compared to the standard Monopoly game. The Monopoly Junior board was based on a fair's midway, and featured 16 "amusements" rather than 28 properties. Players chose a car token in one of four colors (red roller coaster car, blue bumper car, green flume and yellow carousel horse), and used corresponding colored "ticket booths" (hotel pieces from the standard Monopoly game) to denote ownership of the amusements in lieu of title deeds. The game play mechanics are the same as the standard game: players roll a die (a single die, rather than two dice) and move their token clockwise around the board the number of spaces corresponding to the rolled die.

When players land on a vacant amusement they must purchase the amusement for the price shown on the board; the player cannot decline to buy the amusement, and there is no auction. However, as in the standard game, if players have enough money to buy, but not the exact amount, the banker (who also plays) can make change. Amusements cannot be improved with houses or hotels as in the standard Monopoly game. When a player lands on an amusement owned by an opponent they must pay their opponent the value of the amusement marked on the board. If a player lands on one of a pair of amusements of the same color owned by the same player they must pay their opponent double the value of the amusement they landed on. Play continues until one of the players is bankrupted; the player with the most cash on hand wins.

In 2013, the game was revised with the board now based on a simplified version of a city rather than a midway. The player tokens were replaced with a green car, blue ship, orange cat and black dog. The ticket booths were replaced with "sold signs", cardboard pieces featuring cartoon caricatures of the player tokens. The $1, $2, $3, $4 and $5 notes were replaced with single-denomination "Monopoly money" notes, and the prices on the board were denoted with a Monopoly money currency glyph (an uppercase 'M' with two horizontal crossbars) instead of dollars or pounds. The board became more reminiscent of the standard Monopoly board, replacing the "Rest Rooms" (or "Café", depending on the version of the board) with "Jail" and "Uncle Pennybag's Loose Change" with "Free Parking". The four Railroad spaces, the Fireworks space, the Water Show and two Chance spaces were also eliminated, reducing the board size from 32 spaces to 24.

Board

Some space names on the British version of the board have different names, similar to the UK version of the original Monopoly board: "Park Lane" instead of "Park Place", and "Mayfair" instead of "Boardwalk", etc.

Several of the space names are changed to British English terms on the British version of the board: "Candy Floss" instead of "Cotton Candy", "Water Chute" instead of "Water Slide", "Dodgems" instead of "Bumper Cars", "Big Wheel" instead of "Ferris Wheel" and "railways" instead of "railroads". Depending on the version of the board the Rest Rooms may be alternatively called the Café, and Uncle Pennybags may be alternatively called Mr. Monopoly.

Rules
Source: Monopoly Junior (2013) official rules
Players take turns in order, with the initial player determined by age before the game: the youngest player goes first. Players are dealt an initial amount Monopoly money depending on the total number of players playing: 20 in a two-player game, 18 in a three-player game or 16 in a four-player game. A typical turn begins with the rolling of the die and the player advancing their token clockwise around the board the corresponding number of spaces. When the player lands on an unowned space they must purchase the space from the bank for the amount indicated on the board, and places a sold sign on the coloured band at the top of the space to denote ownership. If a player lands on a space owned by an opponent the player pays the opponent rent in the amount written on the board. If the opponent owns both properties of the same colour the rent is doubled.

You may sell properties for extra money or if you don't have enough money to pay the other players.

A player who lands on or passes the GO space collects 2 Monopoly money from the bank. Players who land on a Chance space must take the top Chance card from the draw pile and follow the instructions. No reward or penalty is given for landing on Free Parking or Just Visiting. Players who land on Go To Jail must move their token to Jail (without passing GO nor collecting 2 Monopoly money). To get out of Jail the player may use a Get Out of Jail Free card or pay 1 Monopoly money to the bank at the start of their next turn.

The game is over when a player is bankrupted by not having enough money to pay rent, buy a property or pay a fee on a Chance card. The remaining player with the most money wins. In the event of a tie the player with the most properties wins.

1990 original rules
Source: Monopoly Junior (1990) official rules

The rules of the original Monopoly Junior game are very similar to the modern rules. Players are dealt $31 at the beginning of the game: five $1 notes, four $2, three $3, one $4 and one $5. Players take turns in order, with the initial player determined by chance before the game: players roll the die, and the highest roller goes first. A typical turn begins with the rolling of the die and the player advancing their token clockwise around the board the corresponding number of spaces. When the player lands on a vacant amusement they must purchase the amusement from the bank for the amount indicated on the board, and places a ticket booth token on the colored band at the top of the space to denote ownership. If a player lands on an amusement owned by an opponent the player pays the opponent rent in the amount written on the board. If the opponent owns both amusements of the same color the rent is doubled!

A player who lands on or passes the GO space collects $2 from the bank. Players who land on a Chance space must take the top Chance card from the draw pile and follow the instructions. Chance cards indicating a Free Ticket Booth allow the player to claim a vacant amusement of the color indicated on the card for free, or to remove the ticket booth from an amusement (of the indicated color) owned by another player, unless both amusements of that color are owned by one player; in which case, the player who drew the Chance card must discard it and draw another. No reward or penalty is given for landing on the Rest Rooms, as they are "Just Waiting". Players who land on "Pay $3 Take the Tramway to the Rest Rooms" must pay $3 and place it on Mr. Monopoly's Loose Change and move their token to the Rest Rooms (without passing GO or collecting $2). On their next turn they may roll the die and move their token as usual. Players who land on the Fireworks or Water Show must place $2 on Mr. Monopoly's Loose Change. A player who lands on Mr. Monopoly's Loose Change is rewarded with any money on the space. Players who land on any of the Railroads must roll the die again and move their token.

The game is over when a player is bankrupted by not having enough money to pay rent, buy an amusement or pay a fee. All remaining players count their money, and the player with the most money wins.

2006 rules changes
Source: Monopoly Junior (2006) official rules

There are no Uncle Pennybag's Loose Change or Restroom spots.

Uncle Pennybag's Loose Change is now called Mr. Monopoly's Loose Change. 
Restroom spots are replaced with Lunch spots. 
Players who land on 'Go To Lunch' pay $3 to the bank, then move the pawn directly to Lunch without passing 'GO' or collecting $2.

Differences between Monopoly and Monopoly Junior

Variations
In addition to the standard Monopoly Junior, several variations have been released. Among them:

 Travel Edition (1994)
 Deep Sea Adventure (2000)
 Dig 'N Dinos (2001)
 Toy Story (2001)
 Disney Princess (2004, 2020)
 Shrek 2 (2004)
 Lemonade (2005)
 Disney Channel (2007)
 Trek Alaska
 Despicable Me 2 (2013) - this variation omits the Railway spaces and uses a spinner similar to the "pod" in the Despicable Me 2 Battle Pods game in place of a die, as well as figures shared between the two games and the Despicable Me 2 edition of Operation.
 Frozen (2015)
 Sofia the First (2015)
 Finding Dory (2016)
 Cars 3 (2017)
 Incredibles 2 (2018)
 Trolls World Tour (2020)
 Peppa Pig (2020) - Two variations exist, one displaying the animal characters as the property spaces and another showing locations in Peppa's world.
  Bluey (2022)

References

Board games introduced in 1990
Monopoly (game)
Children's board games